Trilobocarini is a tribe of darkling beetles in the subfamily Pimeliinae of the family Tenebrionidae. There are about five genera in Trilobocarini, found mainly in the Neotropics.

Genera
These genera belong to the tribe Trilobocarini
 Derosalax Gebien, 1926  (the Neotropics)
 Eremoecus Lacordaire, 1859  (the Neotropics)
 Peltolobus Lacordaire, 1859  (the Neotropics)
 Salax Guérin-Méneville, 1834  (the Neotropics and Australasia)
 Trilobocara Solier, 1851  (the Neotropics)

References

Further reading

 
 

Tenebrionoidea